Rhipidarctia silacea is a moth in the family Erebidae. It was described by Plötz in 1880. It is found in Nigeria.

References

Natural History Museum Lepidoptera generic names catalog

Moths described in 1880
Syntomini